Oleksandr Vadymovych Snizhko (born 20 August 1996) is a Ukrainian professional footballer who plays as a midfielder for Faroese club AB Argir.

Career
Snizhko is a product of the Kryvbas and Dnipro Youth Sport Schools. 

After playing for Ukrainian clubs in the different levels, in July 2017 he signed a contract with a new created SC Dnipro-1 from the Ukrainian Second League.

References

External links
 

1996 births
Living people
Footballers from Zaporizhzhia
Ukrainian footballers
Association football midfielders
FC Hirnyk Kryvyi Rih players
FC Dnipro players
FC Bukovyna Chernivtsi players
SC Dnipro-1 players
FC Mynai players
FC LNZ Cherkasy players
FC Alians Lypova Dolyna players
Argja Bóltfelag players
Ukrainian Premier League players
Ukrainian First League players
Ukrainian Second League players
Faroe Islands Premier League players
Ukrainian expatriate footballers
Expatriate footballers in the Faroe Islands
Ukrainian expatriate sportspeople in the Faroe Islands